Chen Qing (born 15 January 1984) is a Chinese table tennis player. Her highest career ITTF ranking was 37.

References

1984 births
Living people
Chinese female table tennis players
Asian Games medalists in table tennis
Table tennis players at the 2006 Asian Games
Medalists at the 2006 Asian Games
Asian Games gold medalists for China
Asian Games bronze medalists for China